is a park in Yamato, Kanagawa Prefecture, Japan. The springs in the park are the source of the Hikiji River that flows into Sagami Bay.

Access and facilities
Izumi no Mori has up to 156 parking spaces for individual cars, depending on the season. The park is close to public transportation, including a bus stop served by the Yamato City Community Bus directly in front of the southern end of the park. Sagami-Ōtsuka Station, on the Sōtetsu Main Line is a 15-minute walk from the park. Both Yamato Station (on the Sōtetsu Main Line and Odakyū Enoshima Line) and Tsuruma Station (on the Odakyū Enoshima Line) are 25-minute walks from the park. Naval Air Facility Atsugi is also located nearby.

Japan National Route 246 goes through the middle of the park.

The park includes a water plants area, a bridge from which the greenery can be observed, a working watermill, a number of minka, a campsite, and a nature observation area.

Flora and fauna
A variety of plants and animals can be viewed in the park, including:
Japanese hornet
Tanuki

References

Parks and gardens in Kanagawa Prefecture
Yamato, Kanagawa